The Northview Formation is a geologic formation in southwest Missouri. Its fauna includes brachiopods and abundant trace  fossils of the Mississippian subperiod and Kinderhookian Series.

See also

 List of fossiliferous stratigraphic units in Missouri
 Paleontology in Missouri

References

Mississippian Missouri